House Rock Valley is a valley on Paria Plateau, north of the Grand Canyon, in Coconino County, Arizona, United States The valley was named by the John Wesley Powell Expedition after a rock formation in the valley where they spent the night in 1871. It is traversed by a highway that is currently designated as U.S. Route 89A.

See also

 List of valleys of Arizona

References

External links

Valleys of Arizona
Landforms of Coconino County, Arizona